The Venezuelan Professional Baseball League or Liga Venezolana de Béisbol Profesional (LVBP) is the professional baseball league in Venezuela. The league's champion takes part in the Caribbean Series each year.

History

Early years
Baseball exploded in Venezuela in 1941, following the world championship in Havana. By then, the appearance of professional baseball in Venezuela attracted many ball players from the Caribbean and the United States to the country, showing a more integrated sport there than it was in the United States. This is evidenced in the hiring of stellar players like Ramón Bragaña, Martín Dihigo, Oscar Estrada, Cocaina Garcia, Bertrum Hunter, Roy Campanella, Sam Jethroe, Satchel Paige, and Roy Welmaker.

On December 27, 1945, the owners of Cervecería Caracas (Caracas Brewery), Sabios de Vargas (Vargas Wisemen), Navegantes del Magallanes (Magellan Navigators), and Patriotas de Venezuela (Venezuelan Patriots) created the Venezuelan Professional Baseball League. The league was formally registered as an institution during January 1946, and in the same month organized its first tournament, starting on January 3, 1946.

Sabios de Vargas, led by Daniel 'Chino' Canónico, became the first champion, with a record of 18 wins and 12 losses.

During the first tournaments, games were played on Thursdays and Saturdays on the afternoons, and Sundays in the morning. This was the norm until Cervecería Caracas' park — located in the San Agustín del Norte zone of Caracas — was fitted with electric lights, enabling its use during night games. Thus, a game was added on Tuesday nights.

Eventually, the tournament was changed to accommodate two rounds, with the top team of each round having a best-of-5 play-off to determine the champion.

1950s and '60s
On August 8, 1952, Pablo Morales and Oscar Prieto Ortiz purchased the Cervecería Caracas team from Martín Tovar Lange, as the Caracas Brewery Co. was unable to continue sponsoring the team and it had the highest payroll of the league. The new owners renamed the team as Leones del Caracas (Caracas Lions), after the full name of the city, Santiago de Leon de Caracas. On October 17, 1952, the 1952-1953 tournament started, with the first game of Leones del Caracas vs. Venezuela BBC. Leones del Caracas would win their inaugural tournament.

The next tournament would see the departure of the teams Sabios de Vargas and Venezuela BBC due to economic problems, being replaced by two teams (Gavilanes and Pastora) from the professional league of the Zulia State, from western Venezuela.

In 1954 Sabios de Vargas was replaced by Santa Marta and Patriotas de Venezuela came back both only for that year.

In 1955 a new team was added in the place of the departed Venezuela, named Pampero; while the Santa Marta BBC was moved out of Caracas, and renamed to Industriales de Valencia (Valencia Industrymen).

The 1956-1957 tournament would see further changes: the Navegantes del Magallanes team was purchased by advertisers Joe Novas and Joe Cruz and renamed as Oriente, leaving the league made of Leones del Caracas, Oriente, Pampero and Industriales de Valencia.

In 1962, Los Tiburones de La Guaira (La Guaira Sharks) were brought into the league to replace Pampero.

In 1965, the league expanded from 4 to 6 teams, with the addition of the teams Cardenales de Lara (Lara Cardinals) and Tigres de Aragua (Aragua Tigers).

For the 1968-1969 tournament, the Industrymen left the city of Valencia and relocated to Acarigua with a new name: Los Llaneros. This left Valencia without a team, prompting the move of Navegantes del Magallanes from Caracas to Valencia, and their return to their original name for the 1969-1970 tournament.

In 1969, Las Águilas del Zulia (Zulia Eagles) were brought into the league to replace Industriales de Valencia.

1970s and '80s
The 1970s saw the first successes for Venezuelan teams outside of Venezuela since the amateur championships of the 1940s, with the Navegantes del Magallanes winning two Caribbean Series. It also saw problems for the league, in the form of the strike that prevented the 1973-1974 tournament, and the problems the Leones del Caracas and Tiburones de La Guaira had in 1975–1976 to secure a baseball park to play their home games. This resulted in both teams merged into one, and forced to move to the city of Acarigua.

Also in the 1970s, Tigres de Aragua won the first championships for the 1960s expansion teams.

The 1980s saw the Leones del Caracas winning five tournaments, consolidating their lead as the most successful team in the league. Leones del Caracas also went on to win three championships in a row starting in the 1979–80 season, and their first Caribbean Series in 1982. The decade also saw success for the Tiburones de La Guaira, with the team winning 3 championships.

Also in the 1980s, the Águilas del Zulia won their first two championships, all the way to also winning their first two Caribbean Series in 1984 and 1989.

1990s and 2000s
In 1991, the league expanded from six to eight teams, with the addition of the Caribes de Oriente (Eastern Caribbeans), who are now the Caribes de Anzoátegui (Anzoátegui Caribbeans); and the Petroleros de Cabimas (Cabimas Oilers), who became Pastora de los Llanos (Llanos Shepherds), and from the 2007–08 season on,  Bravos de Margarita (Margarita Braves). This led to a change in format, with the eight teams being organized in two divisions: the Eastern Division (División Oriental) with the teams Caracas, Magallanes, La Guaira and Oriente; and the Western Division (División Occidental) with the teams Zulia, Lara, Aragua and Cabimas. The first two teams from each division by the end of the regular season of the tournament would qualify to the round-robin semifinals.

The format would change again some years later, with the addition of a wildcard team in the semifinals: the best placed third-place from the two divisions would accompany the other four teams in a round-robin semifinal.

For the 2007–08 season, with the move of the Pastora team from the western city of Acarigua to the eastern city of Porlamar, the Western Division and the Eastern Division were merged into a single division of eight teams, with the top five teams advancing to the semifinals.

The 2015–2016 season saw a new change in format, with a regular season divided in two rounds, which ranked the teams by their record and assigned points depending on their position in the table at the end of each round. The total points from both rounds are added at the end of the regular season, and the teams are then ranked by points. Also part of the format change was the introduction of a sixth team qualified for the semifinals, and the change of the semifinal from a round robin format to two phases of play-offs to the best of 7 games.

In recent years, Tigres de Aragua has become the most dominant team of the league, winning the crown seven times in the last fifteen years, including three times in a row from the 2006-07 season to the 2008-09 season and also winning the Caribbean Series in 2009.

On August 22, 2019, Major League Baseball banned its affiliated players from playing in the Venezuelan League to comply with President Donald Trump’s embargo on Venezuela. This ban is now only limited to Navegantes del Magallanes and Tigres de Aragua.

All Star Game
The league has scheduled All Star Games most years, sometime featuring Criollos (Venezuelan) vs Importados (foreigners), Western Division vs Eastern Division or Stars vs "Stars of the Future", and even a Venezuela's League Stars vs. Dominican Republic's League Stars inter-league all star game during the 2007-2008 and 2011-2012 tournaments.

Current teams

Format
The league houses eight teams in two divisions, the Occidental (Western) and the Central divisions. The tournament is divided into a regular season and a postseason consisting of a semi-final and final round.

Regular season
The regular season follows a round robin format where a total of 63 games are disputed by each of the eight teams that made up the Venezuelan Professional Baseball League, meaning that each team faces every other team a total of 9 times, 5 times as home club and 4 times as away team; the number of games as home club between any 2 clubs alternates year by year.

At the end of the regular season, the teams are ranked from first place to last in their division depending on their win–loss record, and the first 2 teams in each division qualify.

In the case of a tie between qualified teams, their position on the table is determined by the following criteria:

 The team who won the most games in the head-to-head games between the tied teams.
 The difference between runs scored and runs received will be used to break the tie if it persists.
 A drawing of lots will be used if the tie persists.

In the case of a tie between teams where a position in the postseason needs to be determined, the tie will be solved with extra games.

Postseason
The postseason consists of a semi-final and final round. All the series are playoff series to the best of 7 games. In all of these single elimination series, the team with better standing during the regular season has home advantage, playing the first two games as home club, then two games away, and if necessary, the fifth game is away and the last two games as home club.

Semifinal Round
The semifinal round consists of two series in a best-of-seven format. The first team in one division faces the second team in the other division.

There are rest days in both series after the second and fifth games.

Final
The play-off final is a series in a best-of-seven-format between the winners of the semifinal-series. The winner of this series goes on to play is the Caribbean Series.

Past champions

Key

Championships per team

Defunct teams

 Cervecería Caracas
 Estrellas Orientales
 Indios de Oriente
 Gavilanes de Maracaibo
 Industriales de Valencia
 Lácteos de Pastora
 Licoreros de Pampero
 Llaneros de Acarigua
 Llaneros de Portuguesa
 Pastora de los Llanos
 Rapiños de Occidente
 Patriotas de Venezuela
 Petroleros de Cabimas
 Sabios de Vargas
 Santa Marta de La Guaira

Venezuelan Caribbean Series Champions

The Venezuelan champion moves on to the Caribbean Series to face the champions of the baseball leagues of the Dominican Republic, Puerto Rico, Mexico, Panama and Colombia. Venezuela has won the Caribbean Series seven times, most recently in 2009 by the Tigres de Aragua (Aragua Tigers), after having won the LVBP title during the 2008-09 LVBP season.

See also
Baseball in Venezuela
Liga Occidental de Béisbol Profesional
Players from Venezuela in MLB
Venezuela baseball awards
Arturo J. Marcano Guevara (author)
Liga Paralela de Béisbol en Venezuela
Venezuelan Summer League

References

External links
 

 
1945 establishments in Venezuela
1
Sports leagues established in 1945
Winter baseball leagues